Lucien Haudebert (10 April 1877 – 24 February 1963) was a French composer who strongly identified with his Breton heritage.

Life
Haudebert was born in Fougères, Département Ille-et-Vilaine, Brittany. He received his first music lessons at age 5 from the local organist at the Catholic church of Saint Léonard and was able to play his first Bach prelude at age 7. He studied philosophy at a college in Laval and subsequently received a degree in business studies (Diplôme des Hautes Études Commerciales), following his father's wishes. He spent his military service at Vitré until September 1900.

Musically largely self-taught, against his parents' wishes he then went to Paris where he made the acquaintance of Gabriel Fauré, then organist at the Eglise de la Madeleine, and received private lessons from him, cut short by his suffering from anemia. Roman Catholic himself, he married his Protestant wife Mary (1879–1958) in Paris in 1907, a poet who often provided the words for Haudebert's songs and choral pieces. He participated in World War I, leaving the army as lieutenant.

He spent his life mainly in Paris where he died.

Music
The strength of Haudebert's music lay in his melodic inventiveness and his music's "singability". Although he created a large oeuvre of orchestral and chamber music, his vocal and choral music are regarded as his main achievement. His greatest success was the oratorio Dieu vainqueur for vocal soloists, mixed chorus, organ and orchestra, given with 600 participants in December 1927 at Mannheim, Germany.

Harmonically conservative, he wrote in a late Romantic style, often coloured by Breton folk music, particularly in his instrumental music. He was a member of the short-lived Association des Compositeurs Bretons and often participated in Breton cultural events in Paris.

He was awarded the Prix Paul Dukas in 1945. He was a personal friend of a number of other Breton composers as well as of composers Ernest Bloch and Swan Hennessy and the writer Romain Rolland.

Selected works

Vocal music
 La Rose et les papillons (1898), song
 Dieu vainqueur, Op. 15 (1916) for soli, chorus, organ, orchestra
 Dans la maison (1921), songs
 Huit chants intimes (1921), songs
 Églogue (1921, pub. 1922), for voice, flute, piano
 Gethsémani (1921, pub. 1922), for voice, violin, organ
 Ma lande au grand soleil (1923) for choir
 Le Cahier d'Elisabeth (1924), songs
 Chant de Pâques, Op. 23 (1925) for soli, chorus, organ, orchestra
 Trois Évocations (1925) for voice, flute, string quartet
 Nativité, Op. 25 (1926) for soli, chorus, organ, piano
 Ode à la musique, Op. 28 (1927) for female choir and orchestra
 Moïse, Op. 29 (1928) for baritone solo, choir, orchestra
 Requiem, Op. 31 (n. d., unpublished) for soli, chorus, organ, orchestra
 Ubi caritas (1934) for two voices and organ
 Chants funèbres, Op. 45 (1934), songs
 Chants spirituelles, Op. 42 (1936), songs
 Cantique à sainte Thérèse, Op. 47 (1939) for voice and piano or organ
 Nocturne Été, Op. 57 (1943), song
 Te Deum, Op. 59 (1948) for soli, chorus, organ, orchestra

Orchestral music
 La Sacrifice d'Abraham, Op. 11, symphonic poem (pub. 1921)
 La Fille de Jephté, Op. 27 (1926), symphonic poem
 Symphonie bretonne, Op. 44 (1936)
 La Reve inachevé, Op. 49 (1937), incidental music
 Saint Louis, Op. 50 (1938), incidental music
 Voyages en Bretagne. 9 Pièces symphoniques, Op. 55 (n. d.)
 Poème celtique, Op. 56 (1943) for violin and orchestra
 Jeanne d'Arc de Domrémy, Op. 58 (1944), incidental music
 Rapsodie celtique, Op. 64 (1956) for wind orchestra

Chamber music
 Bienvenue à Claudie, Op. 9, for string quartet (published 1931)
 Berceuses (1920) for violin and piano
 Prélude et variation (1920) for violin and piano

Piano music
 Cinq petites pièces (1924)
 Le Cahier d'Eve, Op. 30 (1928, pub. 1930)

Bibliography
 André Tessier: Lucien Haudebert et son oeuvre (Paris: Max Eschig & Maurice Sénart, not dated [1928])

References

External links
 BnF data

1877 births
1963 deaths
19th-century classical composers
19th-century French composers
19th-century French male musicians
20th-century classical composers
20th-century French composers
20th-century French male musicians
Breton musicians
French classical composers
French male classical composers
Oratorio composers